Under Southern Stars is an Australian patriotic song with lyrics written by former Australian immigration minister and Senator Amanda Vanstone. The song is set to the tune of the first of the Pomp and Circumstance Marches by Edward Elgar (or the same as the better-known song set to the same music Land of Hope and Glory).

Vanstone worked on the song for six years as a secret project, before releasing it in early 2007. She stated that the song came about after a discussion with some friends on Australia Day, where it was decided that Australia lacked a song with similar gravitas as the national anthem, Advance Australia Fair. She denied that the song was intended to replace or rival the national anthem, but could be played alongside it, and other classic and modern Australian patriotic songs such as Waltzing Matilda and True Blue at public events.

Lyrics

Home to first Australians,
Joined from near and far,
Shining light for freedom,
Under southern stars.

Nation made of many,
Bound in hope as one,
Building for the future,
Under southern sun.

Free and friendly nation,
Born of our own hand,
Peace our greatest virtue,
Mighty southern land.

Valiant into battle,
Courage to the end,
Standing firm for freedom,
Loyal southern friend.

Nature's earthly heaven,
Glory for our eyes
Ours alone these treasures,
Under southern skies.
Shining light for freedom
Under southern stars.

Full permission for use and reproduction of the lyrics are granted on the song's website at https://web.archive.org/web/20070629224313/http://www.undersouthernstars.com/.

References

Australian patriotic songs